Arnold Oliver (born 17 December 1954) is a Trinidadian cricketer. He played in twenty first-class matches for Trinidad and Tobago from 1973 to 1974.

See also
 List of Trinidadian representative cricketers

References

External links
 

1954 births
Living people
Trinidad and Tobago cricketers